Red lauan or red lawaan is a common name for several plants and may refer to:

Shorea negrosensis, endemic to the Philippines
Shorea teysmanniana, native to Sumatra, Borneo, and peninsular Malaysia